The Holy Qur'an: Text, Translation and Commentary is an English translation of the Qur'an by the British Indian Abdullah Yusuf Ali (1872–1953) during the British Raj. It has become among the most widely known English translations of the Qur'an, due in part to its prodigious use of footnotes, and its distribution and subsidization by Saudi Arabian beneficiaries during the late 20th century.

History
Ali began his translation in the 1920s, after he had retired from the Civil Service and settled in the United Kingdom.

The translation was first published in 1934 by  Shaik Muhammad Ashraf Publishers of Bakhshi Bazaar, Lahore, Punjab, one of the major Islamic publishing houses still in business today. The original translation was in its third edition at the time of Ali's death.

Preface to First Edition, Lahore 4 April 1934

Preface to Third Edition, 1938

Saudi sponsorship
In 1980, the Saudi religious establishment felt the need for a reliable English translation and exegesis of the Qur'an to be made available for the increasing English language readership across the globe. After researching the various translations in print at the time, four high-level committees under the General Presidency of the Department of Islamic Research chose Yusuf Ali's translation and commentary as the best available for publication. After significant revisions, a large Hardback edition was printed in 1985 by the King Fahd Holy Qur'an Printing Complex of Saudi Arabia, according to Royal Decree No. 12412. This edition, however, did not credit Yusuf Ali as the translator on the title page. It served briefly as the officially sanctioned English translation of the Saudi religious establishment, until it was replaced by the Noble Qur'an Salafi translation in 1993 upon the latter's arrival in the marketplace.

Amana editions
The translation established its pre-eminent position in the North American market when Amana Publications of Maryland reprinted the original edition in 1977, retitling it as The Meaning of the Holy Qur'an. Originally printed in paperback in two volumes, it was consolidated into a single hardback edition in 1983.

In 1989, Amana introduced a revised "New Fourth Edition" featuring revision of the translation and commentary—again with politically motivated "corrections"—undertaken with the help of the International Institute of Islamic Thought. The New Revised Amana print is currently in its 11th edition, dated May 2004.

The Islamic Foundation of UK released an 'English Only' hardback edition in 2005, which features both the translation and commentary without the accompanying Arabic text. It is based on the Revised Amana edition with some additional revisions by the Foundation's own editorial staff.

Alleged anti-Semitism
San Diego assistant professor, member of Homeland Security Master's Program Khaleel Mohammed has described the translation as "a polemic against Jews" citing content in its footnotes.  In early 2002 the Los Angeles Unified School District ordered the book removed from school libraries.

References

External links
 Al-Quran Project includes Abdullah Yusuf Ali's translation with commentary and annotated interpretation (original edition from 1934).
 The Qur'an Translation on Feedbooks in Epub, Kindle (Mobi), PDF 
 Android application for searching the Holy Quran, with Abdullah Yusuf Ali's translation available as add-on
 The Holy Qur'an, translated by Abdullah Yusuf Ali
 Three Translations of The Koran (Al-Qur'an) side by side by Abdullah Yusuf Ali et al at Project Gutenberg
 Free English Translation by Abdullah Yusuf Ali available in PDF, EPUB and KINDLE (mobi) formats

English translations of the Quran
1934 books
 
Sunni tafsir